Brian Anthony Flynn (born April 19, 1990) is an American former professional baseball pitcher. Flynn previously played in Major League Baseball (MLB) for the Miami Marlins and Kansas City Royals.

Amateur career
Flynn attended Owasso High School in Owasso, Oklahoma, where he played as a pitcher for the school's baseball team. In 2008, his senior year, he went 9–1 with a 0.79 ERA and was named The Oklahomans all-state player of the year. After graduating, Flynn enrolled at Wichita State University, where he played college baseball for the Wichita State Shockers. In 2011, as a redshirt sophomore, he went 6–4 with a 4.63 ERA in 67.2 innings.

Professional career

Detroit Tigers
The Detroit Tigers selected Flynn in the seventh round of the 2011 MLB draft. He signed with the Tigers, beginning his professional career.

Miami Marlins
On July 23, 2012, Flynn was traded to the Miami Marlins with Jacob Turner and Rob Brantly in exchange for Omar Infante and Aníbal Sánchez.

In 2013, he played between the Jacksonville Suns of the Class AA Southern League and the New Orleans Zephyrs of the Class AAA Pacific Coast League (PCL). On September 3, he was promoted to the majors, and made his MLB debut the following day. In his debut, he lasted four-plus innings, giving up six hits and three runs. Flynn made three additional starts in 2013 for the Marlins, compiling an 0–2 record along with an 8.50 ERA. After the season, Flynn was named a PCL All-Star for his efforts in the minors.

Kansas City Royals
On November 28, 2014, the Marlins traded Flynn and Reid Redman to the Kansas City Royals in exchange for Aaron Crow.

In 2015, Flynn competed for a spot on the Royals 25-man roster out of spring training. Flynn was assigned to the Omaha Storm Chasers of the PCL and on April 9 suffered a torn lat muscle in his first and only 2015 appearance.

In 2016, he began the season with Omaha. He went 2–1 in six appearances while posting a 3.94 ERA and striking out 14 over 16.0 innings. On May 6, the Royals recalled Flynn. On May 6, Flynn made his first MLB appearance since August 7, 2014. Flynn surrendered two runs on three hits, struck out two and walked two over 4.0 innings in a relief appearance against the Cleveland Indians. In 2016 with KC he was 1–2 with a 2.60 ERA in 55.1 innings.

In 2017, Prior to the start of spring training, Flynn suffered a broken rib and three fractured vertebrae when he fell through the roof of his barn, and was ruled out for at least eight weeks. He made just one appearance in the Majors that season.

In 2018, Flynn pitched in 48 games, posting an ERA of 4.04 with a record of 3–5 with one save in  innings.

In 2019 with Kansas City, Flynn appeared in 11 games, posting a 2–2 record and a 5.22 ERA. On July 25, 2019, he was designated for assignment. He elected free agency on October 1. On October 10, he was selected for the United States national baseball team in the 2019 WBSC Premier 12  This did not lead to placement for the Olympic team.

Texas Rangers
On December 16, 2019, Flynn signed with the Texas Rangers on a minor league contract. On July 14, 2020, Flynn elected free agency after difficulties finding a sponsoring team.  To date, there has been no interest shown in renewing any contract by any major or minor league team.

Melbourne Aces
On December 8, 2020, Flynn assigned to the Melbourne Aces of the Australian Baseball League.

International career
Flynn was selected to represent Germany at the 2023 World Baseball Classic qualification.

References

External links

1990 births
Living people
Baseball players from Oklahoma
Erie SeaWolves players
Jacksonville Suns players
Kansas City Royals players
Lakeland Flying Tigers players
Major League Baseball pitchers
Miami Marlins players
New Orleans Zephyrs players
Omaha Storm Chasers players
People from Owasso, Oklahoma
Phoenix Desert Dogs players
United States national baseball team players
West Michigan Whitecaps players
Wichita State Shockers baseball players
2019 WBSC Premier12 players
Melbourne Aces players
American expatriate baseball players in Australia
Rochester Honkers players